The Ch'ŏnnae Line is an electrified  long railway line of the Korean State Railway in Kangwŏn Province, North Korea, connecting Ryongdam on the Kangwŏn Line with Ch'ŏnnae.

History
Originally called the Ch'ŏnnaeri Line, it was opened on 1 November 1927 by the Chosen Government Railway to transport cement from the Ch'ŏnnae Cement Factory at Ch'ŏnnae Station (at the time called Ch'ŏnnaeri Station) to Ryongdam Station on the Hamgyŏng Line, and it was later extended to a colliery. 

Following the partition of Korea, the entirety of the Ch'ŏnnae Line was located in the Soviet zone of occupation. The Provisional People’s Committee for North Korea nationalised all railways in the northern half of the country, including the Ch'ŏnnae Line, on 10 August 1946, and following the establishment of North Korea, the Korean State Railway was created. When Ch'ŏnnaeri Station was renamed Ch'ŏnnae Station, the line received its present name. Electrification of the line was completed in September 1980.

Route 

A yellow background in the "Distance" box indicates that section of the line is not electrified.

References

Railway lines in North Korea
Standard gauge railways in North Korea
Railway lines opened in 1927